Branko Marjanović (Zagreb, 12 May 1909 - Zagreb, 13 February 1996) was a Yugoslav film director and editor.

He graduated from drama school in Zagreb, gained movie experience in Prague and worked on educational filming in Zagreb.

During World War II, he led the Croatian production, directed, wrote, produced and edited the film, and after the war he continued with the director and editor work even on a feature film.

Marjanovic directed the film Ciguli Miguli, a 1952 Yugoslav political satire. It was meant to be the first satirical film of the post-World War II Yugoslav cinema, but its sharp criticism of bureaucracy was politically condemned by the authorities and the film was banned as "anti-socialist".

Giving up film making, he devoted himself to documentaries about nature ("Small Miracles of nature big", "Marmot," Griffon Vulture "). He received the Vladimir Nazor Croatian State Award.

Sources

 

1909 births
1996 deaths
Film people from Zagreb
Yugoslav film directors
Burials at Mirogoj Cemetery
Vladimir Nazor Award winners